Hylestad Church is a parish church of the Church of Norway in Valle Municipality in Agder county, Norway. It is located in the village of Rysstad. It is one of the churches for the Valle og Hylestad parish which is part of the Otredal prosti (deanery) in the Diocese of Agder og Telemark. The white, wooden church was built in a octagonal design in 1838 by Anders Thorsen Syrtveit using plans drawn up by the famous architect Hans Linstow. The church seats about 200 people.

History
The earliest existing historical records of the church date back to the year 1328, but it was likely built around the year 1200. The old stave church was torn down around the year 1664 when the church was over 450 years old. A new log church was built on the same site to replace the old church. Some decorative parts of the old church were saved and reused in the new church. During the demolition of the old church, workers found 24 coins underneath the church that were dated back to the 1200s.

In the 1838, the church was no longer in good condition and it was also too small for the parish, so it was decided to tear down the old church and build a new one. Since the majority of the municipal residents lived on the west side and the newly constructed road through Valle (now Norwegian National Road 9) was also built on the west side of the river, it was decided that the new church would also be built on the west side, right alongside the road. Some of the items from the old church such as the churchyard wall and the main gate were transported across the river ice during the winter from the old church site to the new site. Much of the old interior artwork and the altarpiece were also reused in the new church.

Media gallery

See also
List of churches in Agder og Telemark

References

Valle, Norway
Churches in Agder
Wooden churches in Norway
Octagonal churches in Norway
19th-century Church of Norway church buildings
Churches completed in 1838
13th-century establishments in Norway